Orubica is a village in the municipality of Davor, Croatia.

References

Populated places in Brod-Posavina County